Popham may refer to:

People

Places
 Popham, Hampshire, a small hamlet in the southern United Kingdom
 The Popham Colony, a short-lived English colonial settlement in North America
 Fort Popham, a coastal defense land battery at the mouth of the Kennebec River in Phippsburg, Maine, in the United States

Ships
 , a minesweeper of the British Royal Navy
 USS Popham (PF-90), a US Navy patrol frigate transferred to the UK, which served in the Royal Navy as the frigate